Thavamai Thavamirundhu is a 2005 Indian Tamil-language drama film written and directed by Cheran. The film stars Rajkiran, himself and Padmapriya with Saranya, Senthil Kumar, and Meenal portraying supporting roles. The music was composed by the duo Sabesh–Murali with cinematography by M. S. Prabhu and editing by B. Lenin. The film released on 2 December 2005.

The film won the National Film Award for Best Film on Family Welfare. At 275 minutes, it is the second longest Indian film by runtime.

Plot 
The movie begins with Muthaiah being admitted into the hospital due to a serious head injury. The incident that led to the injury is kept in suspense for the audience.

The story is narrated by Muthaiah's second son Ramalingam, when he comes to visit his father in the hospital. Overcome by emotions, he recollects, along his trip, bits and pieces of memories from his younger days with his father.

The first part of the story is about how Muthaiah, a father in a lower-middle-class family, struggles to raise his children. Muthaiah runs a printing press and works really hard to make ends meet, but he still has to borrow money from the exploitive local moneylenders to give his sons a good education. There is a scene where the children are eagerly expecting their father to return home with gifts during festive season, and the father encounters a setback in the cash flow in his business, and yet seizes an opportunity to make some money by working throughout the night. This scene encapsulates the sacrifices the father makes for the happiness of his sons.

The story then moves to the teenage years of the children, where they find it hard to resist the temptations of the adolescent stage of life. Ramalingam is a good student and gets admitted to an engineering college, where he gradually falls in love with his classmate Vasanthi. Ramalingam finds freedom when he moves from his home to his college residence. When Ramalingam is madly in love with the girl, there is an opportunity for them to have moments of privacy, and they succumb to temptation. This leads to an accidental pregnancy and raises questions about their future. Meanwhile, Ramalingam's brother Ramanathan was married and just had a child. Ramanathan has a misunderstanding with his father and walks out of his parents' home. The main cause of friction within the family is the lack of privacy for Ramanathan and his wife and a lack of freedom for the young couple to run the day-to-day affairs of their family.

Alas, the father expects his sons to help him repay the loans he had to borrow for their education, and they reconcile with each other. During this chaos, Ramalingam is not able to find an opportunity to confess his mistake to his parents. As time runs out, Ramalingam and Vasanthi elope to Chennai, unable to reveal the truth about the pregnancy to their respective parents and face a very uncertain future. They decide to get married and search for jobs. Ramalingam is unable to find a well-paying job and takes up a job in a printing press as a stop-gap arrangement. He has to console Vasanthi in a few situations when he himself is facing a lot of trials and tribulations. Ramalingam and Vasanthi are a loving couple in spite of being in a poor financial situation.

Vasanthi eventually gives birth to a daughter, but Ramalingam struggles to pay for medical expenses. He calls his former classmate and borrows money from his friend. The friend informs Ramalingam's father about Ramalingam's situation. Muthaiah comes to meet Ramalingam and gives him some cash for the sake of the new born child. He also recalls how he himself faced a cash crunch when Ramalingam was born. Ramalingam and Vasanthi are touched by Muthaiah's gesture and decide to move back to Ramalingam's village to get the support from his family in raising the child. They find acceptance from their parents and are relieved. Slowly, Ramalingam finds a good job and moves up in his career. The family becomes more comfortable, and they move to Madurai. They become very close-knit. Ramalingam is responsible and cares for his parents.

Ramalingam facilitates a family reunion with his brother's family, and they reconcile with each other. Meanwhile, Ramalingam's mother Saradha passes away after many years of happy and satisfying family life with Ramalingam's family. After Saradha's final rites, Muthaiah decides to stay in the village to relive the days that he spent with his deceased wife. Meanwhile, Ramanathan comes to his father to ask for some financial help by selling their family home in the village, and Muthaiah gets upset. While upset, Muthaiah slips and falls into a well. He is treated in the hospital but unfortunately succumbs to his injuries and passes away.

Cast

Soundtrack 
The soundtrack album is composed by the musical duo Sabesh–Murali.

Release

Critical reception
Sify wrote "Cheran has kept the flag of uncompromised cinema flying and is one of the handful of directors, whose calling card remain his artistry over the medium. Once again its time to rejoice as his latest Thavamai Thavamirundhu is brilliant and appeals as much to the mind as the heart." Behindwoods wrote "This is a family story that will be liked by all especially the elders. The dialogues are also sentimental and how parents should be treated for whatever they do is highlighted by Cheran".

Box office 
 The film grossed $120 million at the box office.
 Initially, the run time was four hours and thirty-five minutes. Exhibitors forced the director to trim the film to accommodate more shows per day.

Awards and nominations 
 Filmfare Award for Best Supporting Actress – Tamil – Saranya Ponvannan - Won
 Filmfare Award for Best Supporting Actor – Tamil – Rajkiran - Won
 Filmfare Award for Best Supporting Actor – Tamil - Senthil Kumar - Nominated
 Filmfare Award for Best Female Debut – South – Padmapriya - Won
 National Film Award for Best Film on Family Welfare – Thavamai Thavamirundhu - Won
 Tamil Nadu State Film Award for Best Film- Third Prize, 2005 - Won

References

External links 
 
A review by Chennai Online
A review by Thenisai

2005 films
Indian drama films
Indian family films
Films directed by Cheran
2000s Tamil-language films
Best Film on Family Welfare National Film Award winners
2005 drama films